The Finlay Ranges are a mountain range in northern British Columbia, Canada. It has an area of 4818 km2 and is a subrange of the Omineca Mountains which in turn form part of the Interior Mountains.

Sub-ranges
Butler Range
Russel Range

See also
Interior Mountains

References

Omineca Mountains
Omineca Country